Ochrotrichia apalachicola is a species of microcaddisfly. It is only known from a single adult male collected from a cold spring-fed stream in the Apalachicola National Forest, Florida. This is a tiny brown caddisfly up to 3.4 mm in length and can only be distinguished from its closest relatives by minute differences in the genitalia.

References
New species of microcaddisflies from Florida

Hydroptilidae
Insects described in 1998
Insects of North America